Lacrosse has been played in Pennsylvania since the 19th century. There are many respected amateur programs at the club, college, and high school level, as well as several respected past and present professional teams in the National Lacrosse League (NLL) and Major League Lacrosse (MLL).

College lacrosse in Pennsylvania

College lacrosse beginnings

The first lacrosse team in North America was the Montreal Lacrosse Club, established in Montreal, Quebec, Canada by dentist, Dr. William George Beers. A demonstration of lacrosse was given by the Caughnawaga Indians in Montreal in 1834, which resulted in growing interest by Canadian settlers. By the 1850s, Beers codified the game by adding rules and structure. Beers also petitioned for lacrosse to be named Canada's national sport, which led to the formation of the National Lacrosse Association. Montreal Lacrosse Club created the first set of written rules of the game of lacrosse. In 1860, Beers wrote up the codes, rules of the game, reducing the length of games and limiting the number of players to 12 per side. The first game played under these new rules was at Upper Canada College in 1867, where Upper Canada lost to the Toronto Cricket Club 3–1.

Intercollegiate lacrosse in the United States can trace its roots to 1877 when New York University beat Manhattan College two to zero. Also in 1877, the Boston Lacrosse Club started up at Harvard, though a true varsity team at Harvard was not established until 1880. In 1879, the United States Amateur Lacrosse Association was formed by John R. Flannery, a well-known Canadian club player to coordinate the efforts of private, amateur lacrosse clubs in several Northeast cities, including one club that formed in Bradford, Pennsylvania. Flannery had grown up in Canada, been a member of the Montreal Shamrocks Lacrosse Club, and subsequently moved to the United States where he played for a number of amateur east coast clubs. In 1878 he organized a game billed as the National Championship between Union Lacrosse Club and Ravenswood Lacrosse Club of New York City. Encouraged by the turnout of some 40,000 spectators, Flannery set about organizing the disparate lacrosse clubs into a cohesive organization. Ravenswood Lacrosse Club with John Flannery went on to influence lacrosse at several other colleges, playing a well-publicized game against New York University in 1879.

In 1881, the first true varsity level intercollegiate lacrosse tournament was held, with Harvard defeating Princeton in the final, 3–0. This series led to the formation of a league in 1882, known as the Inter-Collegiate Lacrosse Association (the ICLA, later the ILA), which included New York University, Columbia, Princeton and Harvard. At the same time, Flannery's United States Amateur Lacrosse Association comprised eleven college and club teams, but by 1886 the number of clubs had risen to greater than 40. College organizations, including a varsity team at Lehigh University, soon were seeking admittance to the ILA. Lehigh fielded its first varsity squad in 1885, with the University of Pennsylvania, and Lafayette College at the club level, following suit in 1890. Lehigh and Swarthmore were accepted as members in the ILA in 1888 and 1891, respectively.

The first tournament for lacrosse supremacy during this period was known as the Oelrichs Cup, sponsored by Hermann Oelrichs, and first offered up in a tournament format in 1881. Oelrichs was the first president of the United States National Amateur Lacrosse Association, a precursor to the USILA, and he was a member of the New York Lacrosse Club. The Oelrichs Cup was played for much of the 1880s, played mostly by amateur non-scholastic clubs though Princeton did field a tournament team. Arnold K. Reese as part of a powerful Baltimore lacrosse club, won the Oelrichs Cup in 1890. At this time also, Reese had been the main force behind starting up varsity lacrosse at Lehigh. Reese's efforts would lead to Lehigh being one of the early college lacrosse powers. Reese played for Lehigh from 1888 to 1891, winning an ILA title in 1890.

Development of USILA
In 1898 another league, the Inter-University Lacrosse League (IULL) was formed playing with slightly different rules, with Harvard, Columbia and Cornell as charter members. Many of the member teams of both the ILA and IULL joined, dropped out or rejoined at various times over the years. In December 1905, representatives from all the colleges in the two leagues met in New York and formed the United States Inter-Collegiate Lacrosse League, the USICLL initially, soon to be known as the USILL. The colleges entering into this association were Columbia, Cornell, Harvard, Johns Hopkins, Lehigh, Pennsylvania, Stevens and Swarthmore. The USILL acted as the governing body for lacrosse in the United States until it was replaced by the USILA in 1926.

During the first 40 years of organized varsity college lacrosse, known alternately as the ICLA, ILA, USICLL, USILL and USILA, two Pennsylvania schools, Lehigh and Swarthmore fielded dominant teams. The two teams were voted National Champions of college lacrosse a combined fourteen (14) seasons. Glenn "Pop" Warner, the Hall of Fame football coach at the Carlisle Indian School (PA) from 1899 to 1903, substituted lacrosse for baseball during the spring season because he said, "Lacrosse is a developer of health and strength. It is a game that spectators rave over once they understand it." It is also likely that lacrosse, a contact sport, helped prepare his football players for the fall season. By 1920, the USILL had expanded to include teams from Syracuse, Rutgers, Penn State and, encouraged by Pop Warner, even considered adding a varsity team at the University of Pittsburgh. In 1920, college lacrosse realigned their association, adding a Southern Division, which included powerful teams from Lehigh, Penn and Swarthmore along with traditional Maryland power Johns Hopkins. The United States Intercollegiate Lacrosse Association (USILA), the organization still in existence today, officially was formed in November 1925.

As of 1942, the association had only 23 member colleges at that time. The members of the U.S. Intercollegiate Lacrosse Association for the 1942 season were: City College of New York, Cornell University, Dartmouth College, Drexel Institute of Technology, Harvard University, Hobart College, Johns Hopkins University, Lafayette College, Loyola College, University of Maryland, Massachusetts Institute of Technology, Penn State College, University of Pennsylvania, Princeton University, Rutgers University, Stevens Institute of Technology, Swarthmore College, Syracuse University, Union College, United States Military Academy, United States Naval Academy and Yale University.

College lacrosse development in Pennsylvania
Lehigh fielded its first varsity squad in 1885, with the University of Pennsylvania and Lafayette College at the club level following suit in 1890. Penn played intermittently upon starting up lacrosse and so lists 1900 as their first official season of varsity lacrosse. Penn State played its first intercollegiate game against Penn in 1913. In 1917, Lehigh which had gone undefeated for two straight seasons and had won the Southern division that season, won the USILL championship by defeating Penn in overtime 5 to 4 at Franklin Field in a title matchup. Lehigh had beaten Cornell, the Northern division champions, the prior season to capture a share of the USILL national lacrosse title.

Swarthmore won four national titles in the early years of lacrosse. Baltimore Hall of Famer, Philip E. Lamb, led Swarthmore to consecutive titles in 1904 and 1905, "in the days when Swarthmore and Johns Hopkins were the perennial national champs", according to Lamb's Hall of Fame entry. Also, in 1940 Penn State attempted a college box lacrosse league playing top universities including Yale. An appropriately named College Division dominated lacrosse in the early 1950s, consisting of some 20 undergraduate schools from Rensselaer Polytechnic, Army, Virginia, Navy, Hofstra, Yale, Baltimore University, Maryland, Delaware, Drexel, Princeton, Duke, Washington College, Washington and Lee, Johns Hopkins, Loyola, and Western Maryland as well as two club teams from Mount Washington and Maryland Lacrosse Club. Drexel represented Pennsylvania schools well in 1952 reaching as high as number six in the standings.  In the latter part of the 1950s with some 60 colleges playing lacrosse, schools were divided into three divisions. While the 'A Division' included traditional national powers Navy and Johns Hopkins, the 'B Division' and 'C Division' consisted of several potent Pennsylvania universities including Penn, Swarthmore, Penn State, Lehigh, Dickinson, Drexel and Lafayette.

1954 College Division -- Final National Rankings (National Champions in Blue bold) (Pennsylvania schools in italics) 
<div>

A Division (Cyrus Miller Division)
 Navy
 Army
 Duke
 Maryland
 Princeton
 Johns Hopkins
 Virginia
 Yale
 Rensselaer Polytechnic  Institute

B Division  (Laurie Cox Division)
 Syracuse
 Washington College
 Hofstra
 Harvard
 University of Pennsylvania
 Rutgers
 Cornell
 Baltimore
 Swarthmore College
 Loyola
 Hobart
 Dartmouth
 Pennsylvania State University
 Williams
 University of Delaware

C Division  (Roy Taylor  Division)
 Union
 New Hampshire
 Stevens Tech
 Amherst
 Lehigh University
 Oberlin
 MIT
 Adelphi
 CCNY
 Cortland State
 Tufts
 Hamilton
 Dickinson College
 Lafayette College
 Worcester Poly

</div>

University level national titles, post-season NCAA play
In total, Lehigh University has won eleven national titles under various pre-NCAA United States Intercollegiate Lacrosse Association formats for national championships, while Swarthmore University has won five titles.

More recently under the NCAA tournament format in place since 1971, Pennsylvania based universities have participated in many NCAA Men's Lacrosse Championship tournaments including Bucknell (2), Cabrini (16), Drexel (1), Franklin & Marshall (5), Gettysburg (25), Lehigh (2), Kutztown (1), Messiah College (2), Penn (12), Penn State (4), Swarthmore (1), Widener (6) and Villanova (2).

In the 1988 NCAA tournament, Penn led by Tony Seaman and Chris Flynn were the first Pennsylvania school to reach the semi-finals, losing by one goal to the Gait Brothers led Syracuse Orange, which is as far as any Pennsylvania based Division I school has advanced in tournament play. In all, Penn reached the NCAAs six times in the 1980s, including a quarterfinal appearance in 1987.

For the first time in 2011, a Pennsylvania university or college won the NCAA Division II National Title when Mercyhurst defeated Adelphi 9 to 8. Mercyhurst also played in the 2007 Division II national finals, losing a close contest to LeMoyne 6 to 5. Mercyhurst has been to three Division II finals.

Recent NCAA play
Among recent highlights at the university level, the Penn State Nittany Lions men's team in 2019 was 16 and 2, was seeded number one in the 2019 NCAA tournament, becoming the first ever Pennsylvania team to get the number one NCAA seeding in Men's lacrosse and the second Pennsylvania team to make men's lacrosse Division I Final Four. Also in 2019. Grant Ament set the Division I single season record for assists in a season with 95 assists. In 2005, Penn State was named to the NCAA tournament after reaching number eleven in the national rankings. In 2006 Penn upset #3 Cornell on their way to getting an at-large berth in the NCAA tournament.

Gettysburg has had success in Division III, regularly appearing in the top five national rankings and reaching the NCAA title games in 2001, 2002 and 2009. Philadelphia has hosted six NCAA Men's Lacrosse Championship tournament in Divisions I, II & III at Franklin Field and Lincoln Financial Field. In 2009, Villanova defeated Towson in the conference finals to gain the team's first ever NCAA tournament bid. In 2009 Chris Bates head coach for ten years at Drexel took the top job at Princeton.

In 2007, Drexel upset number one ranked and defending National Champion Virginia, 11 to 10, scoring the game-winning goal with three seconds remaining. In 2010, Lafayette won their first six games including consecutive upsets over Navy and Bucknell reaching a national ranking of number eight.

In 2011, for the first time, three Pennsylvania schools were represented in the 16 team NCAA tournament. Penn and Villanova were selected as at-large tournament picks. Bucknell made the tournament by virtue of an automatic qualifier, winning the Patriot league tournament, they took eventual champion Virginia to overtime before losing their first-round game. In 2012 Lehigh was seeded number seven in the NCAA tournament, the first seeded Pennsylvania team since Penn was seeded number four in 1988, they took Maryland to late in their first-round game losing on a Terp goal with just six seconds left. Lehigh also won the Patriot League title in 2013, earning an automatic bid to the NCAA tournament, where they lost to UNC. In 2014, Drexel played in their first NCAA tournament and also become the first Pennsylvania Division I school to win an NCAA tournament game since Penn reached the Final Four in 1988. Penn State has received NCAA tournament seedings, in 2017 they were the number seven seed and in 2013 Penn State received the number eight seed in the tournament.

Men's university lacrosse titlesNCAA or USILA National Titles - 19 Lehigh - 1890, 1893, 1895, 1896, 1897, 1914, 1916, 1917, 1920, 1921 USILA Champions, 1959 USILA Class C Division III National Co-Champion - (11)
 Swarthmore - 1901, 1904, 1905, 1910 USILA Champions, 1953 USILA Division II National Champion - (5)
 Dickinson - 1958 USILA Class C Division III National Co-Champion - (1)
 Mercyhurst - 2011 NCAA Division II Champions - (1)
 Cabrini - 2019 NCAA Division III Champions - (1)

Women's university level
Women's lacrosse started up in Scotland at St Leonards School in the 1890s, but was not introduced into the United States until 1926 at The Bryn Mawr School in Baltimore. The United States Women's Lacrosse Association was established in 1931. Penn State started up a women's program in 1965 and Lock Haven University in 1969. And in 1971 the Association for Intercollegiate Athletics for Women was founded to govern collegiate women's athletics in the United States and to administer national championships.

The most successful programs have been Temple University and Penn State in both the AIAW and NCAA Division I, West Chester University in Division II, as well as Ursinus College and Franklin & Marshall in Division III. Pennsylvania colleges and universities have won a combined 17 USWLA, AIAW and NCAA women's lacrosse national titles.

Temple won championships in 1984 and 1988; Penn State in 1978, 1979, 1980, 1987 and 1989; West Chester in 2002 and 2008; Ursinus in 1986, 1989 and 1990; and Franklin & Marshall in 2007 and 2009. The Penn State Nittany Lions (women) in 1978, 1979 and 1980 went 45-1-3, won the first 3 national collegiate (USWLA) championships in the sport of women's lacrosse, defeating Maryland, Massachusetts and Maryland, respectively, under head coach Gillian Rattray.

Marsha Florio of Penn State and Gail Cummings of Temple are currently the 3rd and 4th all-time highest scoring Division I players with 380 and 378 career points, respectively. Stephanie Kienle and Katelyn Martin both of West Chester are the 1st and 2nd highest all-time scoring Division II players with 390 and 376 career points, respectively.

In 2009 Franklin & Marshall won the Division III national title defeating Salisbury 11 to 10. In 2011 Gettysburg won the Division III national title defeating Bowdoin 16 to 5. Gettysburg won the title again in 2017.

Women's university lacrosse titlesNCAA, USWLA or AIAW Titles - 19 Penn State - 1978, 1979, 1980 USWLA Champions, 1987, 1989 NCAA Division I Champions (5)
 Temple - 1982 AIAW Division I Champions, 1984, 1988 NCAA Division I Champions (3)
 Ursinus – 1986, 1989, 1990 NCAA Division III Champions (3)
 Gettysburg – 2011, 2017, 2018 NCAA Division III Champions (3)
 West Chester – 2002, 2008 NCAA Division II Champions (2)
 Franklin & Marshall – 2007, 2009 NCAA Division III Champions (2)
 Millersville State – 1982 AIAW Division III Champions (1)

High school
 see also, List of Historic Pennsylvania High School, Prep Champions
 see also, PhillyLacrosse.com List of all-time Pennsylvania boys’ state champions

Lacrosse development at the private preparatory school or public high school level in Pennsylvania by the mid-1950s had progressed more slowly than at the collegiate level. At that time, Lower Merion High School and Swarthmore High School were among only a handful of Pennsylvania schools offering varsity lacrosse as a spring sport at the high school level, usually playing against college level junior varsity squads.

But by 1965, a state high school championship system had been put in place. The Hill School was named the first Pennsylvania prep statewide champion of what became known as the Avery Blake Memorial Trophy. Since 2001, with the expansion of lacrosse programs at high schools throughout the state, a new format, the Keystone Cup, has been played where three state sectional champions meet to determine the statewide champion.

In 1973, Sewickley Academy hosted western Pennsylvania's first high lacrosse championship tournament featuring teams from Philadelphia, Detroit and Annapolis. Peet Poillon along with his father started up the lacrosse program at Seneca Valley High School in western Pennsylvania in 2001, with Poillon also scoring 410 career goals. In 2009, Emily Garrity of Strath Haven High School broke the career scoring record for women with 695 total points.

Pennsylvania high schools with the most state lacrosse titles include Lower Merion (7), Ridley (6), Haverford School (5), and Penn Charter (5). In 2008, LaSalle College High won the state title and was ranked fourth in the nation, the highest national ranking of a Pennsylvania prep school up to then. Haverford School regularly appears in the top 15 nationally, and plays recognized programs such as The Gilman and Lawrenceville Schools. Three schools have repeated as champion for three straight years, Harriton High School from 1970 to 1972, Penn Charter from 1974 to 1976 and Ridley from 2001 to 2003. In the 2009 state finals, LaSalle won its second consecutive title in defeating Conestoga High School in its first appearance in the state finals, 7 to 3. LaSalle ended the year ranked 4th in a national poll for the second straight season, while Conestoga finished the year ranked 12th.

In 2011, for the first time a Pennsylvania prep school, the Haverford School Fords were named National High School lacrosse champions. The Fords topped the national polls in both the Laxpower.com and Inside Lacrosse rankings, while repeat Pennsylvania Public champions Conestoga finished third and fourth nationally, respectively.

Haverford was again voted high school/prep national champions in 2015.High School National Titles - 2 The Haverford School - 2011, 2015 voted National Prep/High School Champions

Professional

In 1974, the original Philadelphia Wings became the first professional lacrosse team to operate out of Pennsylvania. The team included popular Philadelphia Flyer player Doug Favell, and the well-known Gene Hart announcing games for the team, as well as Canadian star John Grant Sr., father of John Grant, Jr. The Wings drew crowds of over 10,000 at the Spectrum and reached the league finals in 1974. The team folded along with the original NLL in 1975.

In 1985, a box lacrosse USA/Canada Superseries, an eight-game series, was played at the Spectrum in Philadelphia. This series revitalized interest in box lacrosse and was a precursor to the Major Indoor Lacrosse League and National Lacrosse League.

The Philadelphia Wings, one of the original NLL franchises was started up again in 1987 by among others Mike French, was subsequently disbanded, and had the most championships of any NLL team with six. Early on the Wings made an effort to connect with the local community by drafting local talent including Scott Growney from Harriton High School, J.R. Castle from William Penn Charter School, Mark Moschella and Scott Carruthers from Drexel, Chris Flynn from Penn, and Tony Resch from Penn Charter. Strong fan support was evident even in the Wings initial season, where the team averaged over 10,000 fans for their home games in 1987. Lacrosse Hall of Famers Gary Gait, Paul Gait, Tom Marechek and Dallas Eliuk are among the notable players who have been a part of the club.

The Pittsburgh Bulls played in the NLL from 1990 to 1993 including players Dave Pietramala and Kevin Bilger, and the Pittsburgh CrosseFire played a single season in 2000 until they relocated to become the Colorado Mammoth. In 2004, the Philadelphia Barrage of Major League Lacrosse moved from Bridgeport and played until 2008 when they folded along with three other teams. In five years of operation, the Barrage won three league championships. The team played its home games at United Sports Training Center in West Bradford Township, Pennsylvania.

The NLL once again awarded Philadelphia an NLL franchise for 2018, with this new franchise not associated to the prior Philadelphia franchise, and once more adopting the name Wings.

The Premier Lacrosse League (PLL), a field lacrosse league that started play in 2019, held its first championship game at Talen Energy Stadium, now known as Subaru Park, in Chester. The league uses a unique tour-based model, in which all teams (with the exception of those given bye weeks) play at a single venue over a weekend. After the 2020 season, MLL and PLL merged, with the merged league operating under the PLL branding.NLL or MLL Titles - 9'''
 Wings - 1989, 1990, 1994, 1995, 1998, 2001 NLL Champions (6)
 Barrage - 2004, 2006, 2007 MLL Champions (3)

Notable Pennsylvania lacrosse programs

Today, the national governing body of lacrosse is US Lacrosse. US Lacrosse services the state of Pennsylvania through three local chapters: the Pittsburgh chapter, the Central Pennsylvania Lacrosse chapter and the Philadelphia Lacrosse Association. All three maintain the Pennsylvania Lacrosse Hall of Fame, which honors the great players, coaches, officials and promoters who have made significant contributions to the game at the professional, college and high school levels in Pennsylvania.

College

Pennsylvania based College Lacrosse programs have combined for 38 national lacrosse titles, in Men's and Women's lacrosse, Divisions I, II and III, as well as pre-NCAA titles.

The latest National Champion winners among Pennsylvania universities were Cabrini winning the 2019 NCAA Division III men's title, Mercyhurst with the 2011 NCAA Division II men's title and Gettysburg with the 2018 NCAA Division III women's title.

Lock Haven University reached the women's Division II finals in 2014 and 2015, losing a close match in 2015, 5–4.

Combined men's and women's stats, through 2019.

High school
 Carlisle Area High School (Carlisle, Pennsylvania)
 Conestoga High School (Tredyffrin Township, Pennsylvania)
 Episcopal Academy (Newtown Square, Pennsylvania)
 Friends' Central School (Wynnewood, Pennsylvania)
 Germantown Academy (Fort Washington, Pennsylvania)
 Haverford School (Haverford, Pennsylvania)
 La Salle College High School (Philadelphia, Pennsylvania)
 Lower Merion High School (Lower Merion, Pennsylvania)
 Malvern Preparatory School (Malvern, Pennsylvania)
 Mt. Lebanon High School (Mt. Lebanon, Pennsylvania)
 North Allegheny High School (Wexford, Pennsylvania)
 Penn Charter (Philadelphia, Pennsylvania)
 Penncrest High School (Media, Pennsylvania)
 Ridley High School (Ridley, Pennsylvania)
 Sewickley Academy (Sewickley, Pennsylvania)
 Springfield High School (Springfield, Pennsylvania)
 Spring-Ford High School (Collegeville, Pennsylvania)
 The Hill School (Pottstown, Pennsylvania)
 Upper Merion Area High School (King of Prussia, Pennsylvania)
 Upper Saint Clair High School (Upper St. Clair Township, Allegheny County, Pennsylvania)

Notable college players and coaches from Pennsylvania

The players noted below are those players from the Pennsylvania prep and high school system, who have performed notably in college men's or women's lacrosse. Among the criteria for notability include a player elected to the National Lacrosse Hall of Fame, a player elected to the Pennsylvania Lacrosse Hall of Fame, a player who played a significant role on a national championship team, as well as players who achieved significant statistical measurements at the college level.

 = in National Lacrosse Hall of Fame
 = won NCAA/USWLA National Title

 Notable players from Pennsylvania - Sources

Notable college teams from Pennsylvania

The teams noted below are for universities based in Pennsylvania, who have performed notably in NCAA men's or women's lacrosse.

 = Won NCAA/USWLA Title
 = National Title Finalist

 Notable College teams from Pennsylvania - Sources

See also
 History of lacrosse
 List of the oldest lacrosse teams
 NCAA Division I men's lacrosse records
 Pennsylvania Interscholastic Athletic Association
 United States Intercollegiate Lacrosse Association Champions

External links
 Bucknell Bisons 1996 Schedule at NCAA.org
 Pointstreak History of Lacrosse

References